Telangana State Road Transport Corporation (abbreviated as TSRTC) is a state-owned corporation that runs bus transport services to and from the Indian state of Telangana.  It was formed in 2014 by splitting the Andhra Pradesh State Road Transport Corporation. Many other Indian metro towns in Andhra Pradesh, Karnataka, Maharashtra, Goa and Chhattisgarh are also linked with the services of TSRTC. It serves about 6 million passengers every day, having three zones and services operating through 97 depots.

History 
Road transport corporation in Telangana State was first established as NSRRTD (Nizam State Rail & Road Transport Department), a wing of Nizam State Railway in the erstwhile Hyderabad State, in 1932, with 27 buses and 166 employees. Andhra Pradesh State Road Transport Corporation (APSRTC) was established on 11 January 1958 in pursuance of the Road Transport Corporations Act 1950. Consequent upon bifurcation of Andhra Pradesh state into Telangana and residual Andhra Pradesh, TSRTC operated as a separate entity from 03.06.2015. The Government of Telangana has subsequently established Telangana State Road Transport Corporation (TSRTC), on 27.03.2016, under the Road Transport Corporation Act, 1950.

Divisions
TSRTC has three zones: Hyderabad Rural (HR), Greater Hyderabad (GHz), and Karimnagar (KRMR). It is further subdivided into 13 regions and 25 divisions. It has a fleet of 9190 buses, of which around 2709 are hired vehicles. TSRTC buses undertake operations on 36,593 routes.

Types of services
TSRTC operates a number of different kinds of services, both for urban transport as well as intercity and village transport.

Premium services 
Air-conditioned buses are branded as "Vajra", "Garuda Plus", "Garuda" and "Rajadhani" (previously known as Indra).

Vajra
TSRTC started its new service named Vajra with tag line 'Mobility Redefined' and 'Service At Doorstep'. These are the Mahindra's COSMO 3.3 Liter BS-IV AC Buses. The goal of Vajra was to reduce the hassle of commuters having to travel to a bus station in Hyderabad in order to board an intercity service. Vajra bridged that gap by providing intercity services from various colonies in Hyderabad to Warangal, Nizamabad, Godavarikhani and Karimnagar city.

Garuda Plus

TSRTC operates multi-axle buses of Mercedes-Benz, Volvo, and Scania branded as Garuda Plus buses. Designed for superior ride quality, these buses have reclining seats, while a few older buses also have calf rests. There are two/three LED TVs in each coach with pre-loaded movies depending on the make. As in Vennela, passengers are given a 500ml water bottle, a blanket and a packet of facial wipes. TSRTC operates Garuda plus buses on intercity and interstate routes between urban centers such as Khammam-Bengaluru, Hyderabad-Adilabad, Hyderabad-Karimnagar, Hyderabad-Mumbai, Hyderabad-Vijayawada, Hyderabad-Bengaluru, Nizamabad-Bengaluru, Nizamabad-Tirupati, Warangal-Bengaluru, Godavarikhani-Bengaluru, Karimnagar-Bengaluru, Hyderabad-Pune, Hyderabad-Chennai, Hyderabad-Nagpur, Hyderabad-Bhadrachalam, Hyderabad-Kakinada.

Garuda
TSRTC operates bi-axle buses of Volvo and Isuzu make branded as Garuda. There have been no additions to the fleet since 2009 apart from a few Vennela which were downgraded as Garuda. This class of service is being phased out. Designed for superior ride quality, these buses have reclining seats. As in Vennela, passengers are given a 500ml water bottle, a blanket and a packet of facial wipes. Some popular Garuda routes are Hyderabad-Warangal and Karimnagar, Vijayawada.

Rajadhani
TSRTC operates AC buses built on Ashok Leyland's 12M Viking chassis and Volvo 8400 City Buses branded as ''Rajadhani''. Introduced in 2011, these buses were earlier branded as Indra. Rajadhani buses act as a bridge between mid-level service "Super Luxury" and premium service "Garuda Plus". These buses are generally operated to state capital Hyderabad from various district headquarters. These are also operated on high-frequency long-distance routes. Only water bottles are provided in these buses.

Lahari services

For the first time in the State, the TSRTC has introduced sleeper buses in its fleet for the convenience of passengers travelling long distances. TSRTC chairman Bajireddy Govardhan said that the sleeper buses were designed to bring state-of-the-art amenities to the passengers.

These buses have been named ‘Lahari’. Passengers were urged to use these buses, which have been made available for the first time in the State, as an alternative to the services of private operators. Govardhan and TSRTC MD VC Sajjanar flagged off 10 new non-AC sleeper and sleeper-cum-seater buses in Hyderabad on Wednesday.The routes are from Hyderabad to Kakinada & Vijayawada currently.

Mid-level services 

Mid-level services are branded "Super Luxury", "Deluxe" and "Express".
 Super Luxury

These are non-air conditioned 2+2 push back services which are run from major cities. These are video coaches in which various movies are played. Most of the buses are of Ashok Leyland, Tata, Eicher etc.
 Deluxe

These are non-air conditioned 2+2 services which are run as intercity services. The color of a Deluxe bus is violet. Most of the buses are of Ashok Leyland, Tata, Eicher, etc.
 Express and Semi Express
These are non-air conditioned 3+2 services which are run as intercity services. The color of an Express bus is light blue and dark blue. Most of the buses are of Ashok Leyland, Tata, and Eicher.

TSRTC runs city route buses in urban areas like Suryapet, Mahabubnagar, Siddipet, Godavarikhani and Khammam.

Entry-level services 

Entry-level ordinary service is branded as "Palle Velugu" and "Mini-Pallevelugu". These buses constitute the majority of TSRTC's fleet, and are used to provide connectivity to villages and small towns. Palle Velugu are typically used on short routes connecting villages and small towns to larger towns.

Urban services 

City buses in Hyderabad and Warangal are also branded in a similar fashion. Air-conditioned city buses are branded "Metro Luxury". The city buses to Rajiv Gandhi International Airport (RGIA) are branded "Pushpak(Airport Liner)". Mid-level city services are branded "Metro Deluxe" and "Metro Express" whereas the entry-level "Ordinary" buses are not given any name but are commonly referred to as a "City Bus". These service categories should not be confused with local arrangements like "Merupu", "Trisul" and "Ramabanam".

Special Hire Services 

TSRTC also provides buses for special hire to individuals and organisations for any purpose such as tours, pilgrimage, marriage transport, excursions etc. All kinds of buses are available for Special Hire, each with their own tariff rate.

Electric Buses 
TSRTC inaugurated 40 Electric buses in the capital city, which is the first STU to add electric buses under FAME scheme and named it as 'Pushpak Airport Liner', Which has replaced the 'Tata Marcopolo AC' buses with 'Olectra BYD eBuzz K9'  buses which connects the Hyderabad International Airport from different locations in the city.

Hyderabad Pushpak Airport Liner bus routes 
The following is a list of the airport bus routes operated by TSRTC in Hyderabad.

Cargo Services 

In June 2020, TSRTC launched its Cargo Services in State. These cargo vehicles were refabricated from older, retired passenger buses, and were launched with the goal of transporting governmental goods such as books, departmental materials, question papers and answer sheets for educational institutions and other goods being supplied by the government. Each depot has been supplied with 2 cargo vehicles, and are available for hire by private parties as well.

During the COVID-19 crisis, TSRTC cargo vehicles were used extensively to transport pharmaceuticals and medicinal supplies, as well as farm goods, groceries, and other logistics for the government.

Initiatives 
 TSRTC has converted few scrapped buses into Bio Mobile Toilets which are equipped with an exclusive unit for transgender, two units for women and one unit for men. The mobile toilets will be into service at places that experience high footfall and places where gatherings are held in the state.
 TSRTC has recently launched the 'Pushpak Airport' bus 'live tracking' app for the City Airport buses, where users can view route maps, live track buses, bus number and travel duration and can also access the live location of the bus using the “View on Map” option in the app.
 TSRTC established its own Nursing college,i.e., TSRTC College of Nursing, to meet the needs of the Hospital which will be now allow out patients other than TSRTC employees and the classes of nursing will be starting from the academic year(2022-23) in the TSRTC Hospital in Tarnaka.

Awards and achievements
 2nd best STU at National Level in KMPL improvement during the period from October 2019 to September 2020
TSRTC has been adjudged as “WINNER” in the category “(4) Initiatives taken for adoption of Fossil Fuel/EV vehicles /Alternative Fuel in public transport” for introduction of “Electric Vehicles”
Telangana State Renewable Energy Development Corporation has presented Golden and Silver awards for the year 2019-20 on improvement in fuel efficiency
Highest KMPL fuel efficiency for the year 2014-15
 Award for Excellence 2016 - Best Bus Transportation

Accidents and incidents 
 On 11 September 2018 India's worst bus tragedy took place in Telangana when a bus belonging to Jagtial depot was jam-packed with 88 passengers swerved off a ghat road and hurtled 30 feet down onto a valley at Sanivarampet killing 56 people and injuring 32 on board. The mishap occurred when bus driver Srinivas lost control over the wheel near Sanivarampet. Srinivas reportedly failed to slow down the vehicle as he failed to see a speed-breaker. When the bus hit the bump at high speed, Srinivas lost control over the wheel, resulting in the mishap. The vehicle rolled four times before falling onto the valley.

Protest 
48000 employees stayed off work for a period of 52 days starting 5 October 2019, protesting against hostile working environments, arbitrary pay cuts and loan denials, unsanitary workplaces, long working hours, as well as asking for a merger of the corporation into the state government.

The transport strike was met with solidarity from other unions such as the Teacher's Union, Employees Union, TNGO, TS TRANSCO etc.

The strike was met with brutal suppression from the state government and Telangana Police, who fired non lethal rounds into crowds of protestors, as well as taking a large number of them into custody.

Unable to continue amid the brutal suppression, the workers were finally forced into calling off the strike on 25 November.

References

External links 

 
Ticket Booking Site
 TSRTC

Companies based in Hyderabad, India
Transport in Telangana
State agencies of Telangana
State road transport corporations of India
Indian companies established in 2014
Transport companies established in 2014
2014 establishments in Telangana
Government agencies established in 2014